The 2002–03 New Jersey Nets season was the Nets' 36th season in the National Basketball Association, and 27th season in East Rutherford, New Jersey. The Nets entered the season as runners-up in the 2002 NBA Finals, where they were swept by the two-time defending NBA champion Los Angeles Lakers in four games. During the off-season, the Nets acquired All-Star center Dikembe Mutombo from the Philadelphia 76ers, and signed free agent Rodney Rogers. However, Mutombo only played just 24 games due to a wrist injury. The Nets got off a solid start with a 26–9 record, while posting a ten-game winning streak between December and January, and holding a 34–15 record at the All-Star break. However, the team played below .500 for the remainder of the season, but finished in first place in the Atlantic Division with a 49–33 record, while posting a successful 33–8 home record. 

Jason Kidd averaged 18.7 points, 6.3 rebounds, 8.9 assists and 2.2 steals per game, and was named to the All-NBA Second Team, the NBA All-Defensive Second Team, and was selected for the 2003 NBA All-Star Game, In addition, Kenyon Martin averaged 16.7 points and 8.3 rebounds per game, while second-year forward Richard Jefferson showed improvement averaging 15.5 points and 6.4 rebounds per game, and Kerry Kittles provided with 13.0 points and 1.6 steals per game. Sixth man Lucious Harris contributed 10.3 points per game, while Rogers provided with 7.0 points per game off the bench, and Mutombo averaged 5.8 points, 6.4 rebounds and 1.5 blocks per game. Kidd also finished in ninth place in Most Valuable Player voting.

In the Eastern Conference First Round of the playoffs, the Nets defeated the Milwaukee Bucks in six games, then swept the 6th-seeded Boston Celtics in four straight games in the Eastern Conference Semi-finals, and then defeated the top-seeded Detroit Pistons in another four-game sweep in the Eastern Conference Finals. For the second consecutive year, they made it to the NBA Finals. However, they lost to the San Antonio Spurs in a six-game series. Following the season, Mutombo was released to free agency, and signed as a free agent with the New York Knicks.

Offseason
On August 1, the Nets re-signed Chris Childs as a free agent; Childs previously played for the Nets from 1994 to 1996. Five days later, the organization traded Todd MacCulloch and Keith Van Horn to the Philadelphia 76ers for Dikembe Mutombo. On August 14, the Nets signed Rodney Rogers as a free agent. On October 25, they signed Anthony Johnson as a free agent. Their final offseason transaction would come three days later, when they waived Donny Marshall.

Draft picks

Roster

Regular season

Season standings

Record vs. opponents

Playoffs

|- align="center" bgcolor="#ccffcc"
| 1
| April 19
| Milwaukee
| W 109–96
| Kenyon Martin (21)
| Kenyon Martin (15)
| Jason Kidd (14)
| Continental Airlines Arena16,102
| 1–0
|- align="center" bgcolor="#ffcccc"
| 2
| April 22
| Milwaukee
| L 85–88
| Kenyon Martin (22)
| Kenyon Martin (12)
| Jason Kidd (8)
| Continental Airlines Arena17,633
| 1–1
|- align="center" bgcolor="#ccffcc"
| 3
| April 24
| @ Milwaukee
| W 103–101
| Jason Kidd (26)
| Collins, Martin (8)
| Jason Kidd (7)
| Bradley Center17,539
| 2–1
|- align="center" bgcolor="#ffcccc"
| 4
| April 26
| @ Milwaukee
| L 114–119 (OT)
| Kenyon Martin (30)
| Jason Collins (8)
| Jason Kidd (10)
| Bradley Center18,391
| 2–2
|- align="center" bgcolor="#ccffcc"
| 5
| April 29
| Milwaukee
| W 89–82
| Jason Kidd (19)
| Richard Jefferson (16)
| Kidd, Martin (5)
| Continental Airlines Arena16,601
| 3–2
|- align="center" bgcolor="#ccffcc"
| 6
| May 1
| @ Milwaukee
| W 113–101
| Kenyon Martin (29)
| Jason Kidd (11)
| Jason Kidd (11)
| Bradley Center18,717
| 4–2
|-

|- align="center" bgcolor="#ccffcc"
| 1
| May 5
| Boston
| W 97–93
| Kenyon Martin (21)
| Jefferson, Williams (9)
| Jason Kidd (9)
| Continental Airlines Arena17,343
| 1–0
|- align="center" bgcolor="#ccffcc"
| 2
| May 7
| Boston
| W 104–95
| Richard Jefferson (25)
| Jason Kidd (11)
| Jason Kidd (8)
| Continental Airlines Arena19,934
| 2–0
|- align="center" bgcolor="#ccffcc"
| 3
| May 9
| @ Boston
| W 94–76
| Kenyon Martin (25)
| Jason Kidd (9)
| Jason Kidd (11)
| FleetCenter18,624
| 3–0
|- align="center" bgcolor="#ccffcc"
| 4
| May 12
| @ Boston
| W 110–101 (2OT)
| Jason Kidd (29)
| Kidd, Martin (10)
| Jason Kidd (8)
| FleetCenter18,624
| 4–0
|-

|- align="center" bgcolor="#ccffcc"
| 1
| May 18
| @ Detroit
| W 76–74
| Kenyon Martin (16)
| Jason Collins (10)
| Jason Kidd (7)
| The Palace of Auburn Hills22,076
| 1–0
|- align="center" bgcolor="#ccffcc"
| 2
| May 20
| @ Detroit
| W 88–86
| Kenyon Martin (25)
| Jason Collins (14)
| Jason Kidd (5)
| The Palace of Auburn Hills22,076
| 2–0
|- align="center" bgcolor="#ccffcc"
| 3
| May 22
| Detroit
| W 97–85
| Jason Kidd (34)
| Jason Kidd (12)
| Jason Kidd (6)
| Continental Airlines Arena19,923
| 3–0
|- align="center" bgcolor="#ccffcc"
| 4
| May 24
| Detroit
| W 102–82
| Jason Kidd (26)
| Jason Kidd (12)
| Jason Kidd (7)
| Continental Airlines Arena19,923
| 4–0
|-

|- align="center" bgcolor="#ffcccc"
| 1
| June 4
| @ San Antonio
| L 89–101
| Kenyon Martin (21)
| Kenyon Martin (12)
| Jason Kidd (10)
| SBC Center18,797
| 0–1
|- align="center" bgcolor="#ccffcc"
| 2
| June 6
| @ San Antonio
| W 87–85
| Jason Kidd (30)
| Jason Kidd (7)
| Kenyon Martin (4)
| SBC Center18,797
| 1–1
|- align="center" bgcolor="#ffcccc"
| 3
| June 8
| San Antonio
| L 79–84
| Kenyon Martin (23)
| Kenyon Martin (11)
| Jason Kidd (11)
| Continental Airlines Arena19,280
| 1–2
|- align="center" bgcolor="#ccffcc"
| 4
| June 11
| San Antonio
| W 77–76
| Kenyon Martin (20)
| Kenyon Martin (13)
| Jason Kidd (9)
| Continental Airlines Arena19,280
| 2–2
|- align="center" bgcolor="#ffcccc"
| 5
| June 13
| San Antonio
| L 83–93
| Jason Kidd (29)
| Kenyon Martin (9)
| Jason Kidd (7)
| Continental Airlines Arena19,280
| 2–3
|- align="center" bgcolor="#ffcccc"
| 6
| June 15
| @ San Antonio
| L 77–88
| Jason Kidd (21)
| Kenyon Martin (10)
| Jason Kidd (7)
| SBC Center18,797
| 2–4

Player statistics

Regular season

|-
|Jason Kidd
|80
|80
|37.4
|.414
|.341
|.841
|6.3
|8.9
|2.2
|0.3
|18.7
|-
|Kenyon Martin
|77
|77
|34.1
|.470
|.209
|.653
|8.3
|2.4
|1.3
|0.9
|16.7
|-
|Richard Jefferson
|80
|80
|36.0
|.501
|.250
|.743
|6.4
|2.5
|1.0
|0.6
|15.5
|-
|Kerry Kittles
|65
|57
|30.0
|.467
|.356
|.785
|3.9
|2.6
|1.6
|0.5
|13.0
|-
|Lucious Harris
|77
|25
|25.6
|.413
|.346
|.804
|3.0
|2.0
|0.7
|0.1
|10.3
|-
|Rodney Rogers
|68
|0
|19.2
|.402
|.333
|.756
|3.9
|1.6
|0.7
|0.5
|7.0
|-
|Aaron Williams
|81
|0
|19.7
|.453
|.000
|.785
|4.1
|1.1
|0.3
|0.7
|6.2
|-
|Dikembe Mutombo
|24
|16
|21.4
|.374
|
|.727
|6.4
|0.8
|0.2
|1.5
|5.8
|-
|Jason Collins
|81
|66
|23.5
|.414
|.000
|.763
|4.5
|1.1
|0.6
|0.5
|5.7
|-
|Anthony Johnson
|66
|2
|12.8
|.446
|.371
|.689
|1.2
|1.3
|0.6
|0.1
|4.1
|-
|Brian Scalabrine
|59
|7
|12.3
|.402
|.359
|.833
|2.4
|0.8
|0.3
|0.3
|3.1
|-
|Tamar Slay
|36
|0
|7.6
|.379
|.280
|.700
|0.9
|0.4
|0.4
|0.1
|2.6
|-
|Brandon Armstrong
|17
|0
|4.1
|.333
|.167
|.833
|0.2
|0.1
|0.2
|0.1
|1.4
|-
|Chris Childs
|12
|0
|8.8
|.300
|.167
|.667
|0.4
|1.3
|0.7
|0.1
|1.3
|-
|Donny Marshall
|3
|0
|2.0
|.000
|.000
|
|1.0
|0.0
|0.0
|0.0
|0.0
|}

Playoffs

|-
|Jason Kidd
|20
|20
|42.6
|.402
|.327
|.825
|7.7
|8.2
|1.8
|0.2
|20.1
|-
|Kenyon Martin
|20
|20
|38.9
|.453
|.091
|.693
|9.4
|2.9
|1.5
|1.6
|18.9
|-
|Richard Jefferson
|20
|20
|35.6
|.476
|.000
|.718
|6.4
|2.4
|0.8
|0.2
|14.1
|-
|Kerry Kittles
|20
|20
|30.7
|.395
|.413
|.762
|3.5
|2.0
|1.5
|0.3
|10.8
|-
|Lucious Harris
|20
|0
|21.8
|.391
|.333
|.783
|2.6
|1.6
|0.5
|0.0
|7.8
|-
|Rodney Rogers
|20
|0
|17.5
|.372
|.405
|.711
|2.8
|1.4
|0.3
|0.2
|6.7
|-
|Aaron Williams
|19
|0
|17.9
|.472
|
|.742
|4.6
|0.9
|0.3
|0.9
|6.5
|-
|Jason Collins
|20
|20
|26.5
|.363
|.000
|.836
|6.3
|0.9
|0.7
|0.6
|5.9
|-
|Anthony Johnson
|17
|0
|7.2
|.548
|.500
|.833
|0.7
|1.1
|0.1
|0.0
|2.5
|-
|Dikembe Mutombo
|10
|0
|11.5
|.467
|
|1.000
|2.7
|0.6
|0.3
|0.9
|1.8
|-
|Brian Scalabrine
|7
|0
|2.9
|.500
|.000
|
|0.6
|0.0
|0.0
|0.0
|0.6
|-
|Tamar Slay
|6
|0
|1.8
|.250
|1.000
|
|0.0
|0.0
|0.0
|0.0
|0.5
|}
Player Statistics Citation:

Awards and records
 Jason Kidd, All-NBA Second Team
 Jason Kidd, NBA All-Defensive Second Team
 Jason Kidd, NBA All-Star

Transactions

Overview

Trades

Free agents

Player Transactions Citation:

References

 New Jersey Nets on Database Basketball
 New Jersey Nets on Basketball Reference

New Jersey Nets season
New Jersey Nets seasons
New Jersey Nets
New Jersey Nets
21st century in East Rutherford, New Jersey
Eastern Conference (NBA) championship seasons
Meadowlands Sports Complex